The Rubis was a 60-gun ship of the line of the French Navy. She was designed and built by Laurent Hubac in Brest Dockyard between 1662 and 1665. She was captured by the English Navy in September 1666 at the Battle off Dungeness and added to the English Navy, with which she served for the next 19 years,

References 
 
 Nomenclature des Vaisseaux du Roi-Soleil de 1661 a 1715. Alain Demerliac (Editions Omega, Nice – various dates).
 The Sun King's Vessels (2015) - Jean-Claude Lemineur; English translation by François Fougerat. Editions ANCRE. 
 Winfield, Rif and Roberts, Stephen (2017) French Warships in the Age of Sail 1626-1786: Design, Construction, Careers and Fates. Seaforth Publishing. .

1660s ships
Ships of the line of the French Navy
Ships built in France